Antonio Núñez Tena (born 15 January 1979) is a Spanish retired professional footballer who played as a right midfielder.

His early career included spells at Real Madrid and Liverpool, on the fringes of both teams. Much of the rest of his career was spent in Segunda División, while he also played three years for Apollon Limassol in Cyprus.

Club career

Real Madrid
Born in Madrid, Núñez started his career with CD San Federico, before joining Tercera División team CD Las Rozas. In 2001 he moved to Real Madrid, his favourite club growing up.

Courtesy of manager Carlos Queiroz, Núñez was promoted to the main squad for the 2003–04 season. On 2 September 2003, in his La Liga debut, he came on as a substitute for Javier Portillo 15 minutes from time in an away game against Villarreal CF and scored the 1–1 equaliser after just seven minutes; for the remainder of the campaign, however, in which the Merengues came up totally empty, he only made a further ten league appearances, all from the bench.

Liverpool
In August 2004, Núñez was transferred to Liverpool, becoming Rafael Benítez's second signing as manager – after compatriot Josemi – as part of an exchange deal that saw Michael Owen go in the opposite direction for £8 million. He injured his knee in his first day of training for the Reds, and was out of action for three months. He made his Premier League debut on 28 November, playing 21 minutes in a 2–1 win over Arsenal.

Núñez scored his first and only goal for Liverpool in the 3–2 loss against Chelsea in the final of the Football League Cup, therefore becoming the only player in the club's history to score his only goal for the team in a major cup final. In his only season, he also won a UEFA Champions League medal, as he was one of the substitutes in the final against A.C. Milan (although he did not play).

Celta and later years
Following a disappointing season, Núñez transferred back to Spain and joined newly promoted RC Celta de Vigo on 26 July 2005. During his three-year spell with the Galicians, where he would be heavily played, he also lived one top-flight relegation, and joined Real Murcia in the summer of 2008.

In August 2009, Núñez bought out the remainder of his Murcia contract and was released, shortly after joining Cyprus' Apollon Limassol FC. After three seasons, he returned to his country and its Segunda División, signing a one-and-a-half-year deal with SD Huesca. After the team's relegation in 2013, he remained in the division by agreeing to a four-month contract at Deportivo de La Coruña on 12 September; he was part of the squad that returned to the top tier after one year, but started in only seven matches and did not score once.

On 8 July 2014, Núñez signed a one-year deal at Recreativo de Huelva, scoring five times in his first season as the team descended to Segunda División B. In April 2016, he spoke to Diario AS about the club's financial emergency that was threatening its existence.

Career statistics

Club

Honours
Liverpool
UEFA Champions League: 2004–05
Football League Cup runner-up: 2004–05

Apollon Limassol
Cypriot Cup: 2009–10

References

External links

1979 births
Living people
Spanish footballers
Footballers from Madrid
Association football midfielders
La Liga players
Segunda División players
Segunda División B players
Tercera División players
Las Rozas CF players
Real Madrid Castilla footballers
Real Madrid CF players
RC Celta de Vigo players
Real Murcia players
SD Huesca footballers
Deportivo de La Coruña players
Recreativo de Huelva players
Premier League players
Liverpool F.C. players
Cypriot First Division players
Apollon Limassol FC players
UEFA Champions League winning players
Spanish expatriate footballers
Expatriate footballers in England
Expatriate footballers in Cyprus
Spanish expatriate sportspeople in England
Spanish expatriate sportspeople in Cyprus